The Reno Silver Sox were a minor league baseball team that existed on and off from 1947 to 1992. The team name is derived from the nickname of Nevada, the "Silver State".  There was another baseball team known as the Reno Silver Sox who played in the Golden Baseball League.  From part of the 1955 season to 1992, they played their home games at Moana Stadium. The 1961 Silver Sox were recognized as one of the 100 greatest minor league teams of all time.

History

After Reno first hosted a team in the 1907 Nevada State League, the Reno Silver Sox became members of the 1947 Sunset League and continued in the league from 1947 to 1949. They were affiliated with the New York Giants during their time in the Sunset League. From 1950 to 1951, they were unaffiliated and played in the Far West League. Starting in 1955, they played in the California League, when the Channel Cities Oilers moved to Reno to become the second incarnation of the Reno Silver Sox. They became affiliated with the Brooklyn Dodgers in 1956 and stayed affiliated with them until the Dodgers' move in 1957. They were then affiliated with the Los Angeles Dodgers until 1962. From 1963 to 1964, they were affiliated with the Pittsburgh Pirates. They did not organize in 1965, and therefore did not play ball. They came back in 1966 and lasted until 1981. From 1966 to 1974, they were affiliated with the Cleveland Indians. From 1975 to 1976 they were affiliated with both the Minnesota Twins and San Diego Padres. From 1977 to 1981, they were affiliated with just the Padres. After the 1981 season, the team was renamed the Reno Padres and baseball was not played under the "Reno Silver Sox" name again until 1988. Still in the California League, they were unaffiliated from 1988 to 1991. In 1992 – the last season in which a "Silver Sox" team played in an affiliated league – they were affiliated with the Oakland Athletics. Following the 1992 season, the team left Reno and move to Riverside to become the Riverside Pilots. In 1996, they moved to Lancaster and became the Lancaster JetHawks.

Championships

The Reno Silver Sox were league champions in 1948, 1960, 1961, 1975, and 1976. They are the only team in California League history to win back-to-back championships twice.

Notable Reno alumni

Baseball Hall of Fame alumni

Roberto Alomar (1986) Inducted, 2011
 Bobby Cox (1960) Inducted, 2014
Dennis Eckersley (1972-1973) Inducted, 2004

Other notable alumni

Larry Andersen (1973)
Alan Ashby (1970-1971)
Phil Cavarretta (1966-1967, MGR)  4 x MLB All-Star; 1945 NL Batting Title; 1945 NL Most Valuable Player
 Storm Davis (1947)
Willie Davis (1959) 2 x MLB All-Star
Ed Farmer (1968) MLB All-Star
 Tim Flannery (1978)
 Ray Fosse (1966) 2 x MLB All-Star
Alfredo Griffin (1974) MLB All-Star; 1979 AL Rookie of the Year
 Ozzie Guillen (1982) 3 x MLB All-Star; 1985 AL Rookie of the Year
 Andy Hawkins (1979-1980)
 Jim Kern (1970-1971) 3 x MLB All-Star
 John Kruk (1982) 3 x MLB All-Star
Duane Kuiper (1972)
Jim Lefebvre (1962) MLB All-Star; 1965 NL Rookie of the Year
 John Lowenstein (1968-1969)
Rick Manning (1972-1973)
Pinky May (1970-1971, MGR) MLB All-Star
Kevin McReynolds (1982)
Ken McMullen (1961)
Jeff Newman (1971-1972) MLB All-Star and manager
 Mike Norris (1991) MLB All-Star
 Gene Richards (1975)
Pete Richert (1958) 2 x MLB All-Star
Benito Santiago (1984) 5 x MLB All-Star; 1987 NL Rookie of the Year
Eric Show (1979)
Bill Singer (1962) 2 x MLB All-Star
Charley Smith (1957)
Dick Tidrow (1967-1971)
Bobby Tolan (1963)
Eddie Watt (1978-1979, MGR)
 Mitch Williams (1983-1984) MLB All-Star
 Butch Wynegar (1975) 2 x MLB All-Star

Year-by-year record

References

External links
Moana Stadium page
Waymarking Moana Stadium page
Reno Ballpark Update
Reno Silver Sox California League statistics and records at The Baseball Cube (1978–1992)

Defunct Far West League teams
Defunct California League teams
Baseball teams established in 1947
Sports in Reno, Nevada
Professional baseball teams in Nevada
Oakland Athletics minor league affiliates
Minnesota Twins minor league affiliates
San Diego Padres minor league affiliates
Pittsburgh Pirates minor league affiliates
Los Angeles Dodgers minor league affiliates
Brooklyn Dodgers minor league affiliates
New York Giants minor league affiliates
1947 establishments in Nevada
1992 disestablishments in Nevada
Baseball teams disestablished in 1992
Defunct baseball teams in Nevada